Cieśle may refer to the following places in Poland:
Cieśle, Lower Silesian Voivodeship (south-west Poland)
Cieśle, Piotrków County in Łódź Voivodeship (central Poland)
Cieśle, Wieluń County in Łódź Voivodeship (central Poland)
Cieśle, Świętokrzyskie Voivodeship (south-central Poland)
Cieśle, Piaseczno County in Masovian Voivodeship (east-central Poland)
Cieśle, Gmina Bodzanów in Masovian Voivodeship (east-central Poland)
Cieśle, Gmina Drobin in Masovian Voivodeship (east-central Poland)
Cieśle, Oborniki County in Greater Poland Voivodeship (west-central Poland)
Cieśle, Pleszew County in Greater Poland Voivodeship (west-central Poland)
Cieśle, Poznań County in Greater Poland Voivodeship (west-central Poland)